The Pittsburgh Rebellion was a women's American football team based in Pittsburgh and a member of the Legends Football League (LFL).

History 
The franchise was announced as the twenty-first franchise in the Legends Football League (LFL) in late 2016. The team was a member of the Eastern Conference in the 2017 season and played in Highmark Stadium, an outdoor soccer-specific stadium. Following the season, the Rebellion decided not to play in 2018 in order to find a more suitable venue to host the team's home games. The team also did not return in the 2019 season, but planned a 2020 return before the entire league essentially ceased operations in December 2019.

Seasons

2017 season

References

External links
Official website 

Legends Football League US teams
American football teams established in 2017
2017 establishments in Pennsylvania
Women's sports in Pennsylvania